Andrea Long Chu (born 1992) is an American writer and critic. Chu has written for such publications as n+1 and The New York Times, and various academic journals including differences, Women & Performance, and Transgender Studies Quarterly. Chu's first book, Females, was published in 2019 by Verso Books and was a finalist for the Lambda Literary Award. In 2021, she joined the staff at New York Magazine as a book critic.

Early life and education

Chu was born in Chapel Hill, North Carolina in 1992. Her father was finishing a medical residency at the University of North Carolina and her mother was in graduate school at the time of her birth. Her father is half Chinese. A few years later, Chu moved with her family to Asheville, North Carolina. Although she described Asheville as a "very hippy dippy kind of place," Chu said that she was "raised pretty Christian." She attended a small Christian school. Her family belonged to a conservative Presbyterian church. Chu described her childhood as "saturated" with Christianity.
 
Chu went to Duke University for college and graduated in 2014. She started as a theatre major and eventually graduated with a degree in literature.

Chu is currently a doctoral student in comparative literature at New York University.

Career
Chu gave an account of her early life when she was interviewed in 2018 by Michelle Esther O'Brien for the New York City Trans Oral History Project.

In 2018 Chu published "On Liking Women" in n+1 magazine, an essay in which she considered her own gender transition, discussed her fascination for Valerie Solanas' SCUM Manifesto, and explored how her attitudes about her gender transition evolved in relation to feminist writings she had read. In the essay, Chu wrote, "The truth is I have never been able to differentiate liking women from wanting to be like them."

Chu has also published in academic journals, writing about Hegel's remarks on Africa in the Lectures on the Philosophy of World History in the Journal of Speculative Philosophy (2018) and about the impossibility of feminism in differences, a Journal of Feminist Cultural Studies (2019).

Chu also wrote an opinion piece published in The New York Times, "My New Vagina Won't Make Me Happy." In that piece, written a few days before Chu underwent sex reassignment surgery, she discussed her gender dysphoria, her experiences with hormone therapy, and questioned the widespread belief that gender transitioning will make a trans person feel better. "There are no good outcomes in transition," she wrote. "There are only people, begging to be taken seriously."

Chu wrote about her experiences as a teaching assistant for Avital Ronell at New York University, stating that based on those experiences she believed the accusations of sexual harassment leveled at Ronell by graduate student Nimrod Reitman.

In 2019, Chu published her first book, Females. Published in 2019 by Verso Books, the book was selected as a finalist for the Lambda Literary Award in Transgender Nonfiction.

In 2021, Chu published a full-length profile on writer and model Emily Ratajkowski for The New York Times Magazine.

In 2021, Chu was named a staff book critic for New York. To date, she has written critical reviews of books like Hanya Yanagihara's To Paradise and Maggie Nelson's On Freedom.

Reception 
Writer Sandy Stone praised Chu's 2018 essay, "On Liking Women," and stated that the essay "launched 'the second wave' of trans studies." Mareile Pfannebecker, for the London School of Economics' Long Read Review, wrote of Chu's "admirable boldness," noting how effectively she "makes the case that the gender experience of trans women like her rests not on identity but on desire."

Amia Srinivasan criticized "On Liking Women," writing in the London Review of Books that Chu's essay "threatens to bolster the argument made by anti-trans feminists: that trans women equate, and conflate, womanhood with the trappings of traditional femininity, thereby strengthening the hand of patriarchy." Chu responded to Srinivasan's criticisms in a dialogue with Anastasia Berg that was published in The Point.

Noah Zazanis, writing for The New Inquiry, expresses reservations about "On Liking Women," suggesting that Chu's essay has poor implications for trans men: "the connections Chu draws between transfeminine transition and political lesbianism themselves parallel a narrative frequently used to condemn transmasculine desire" and asks, "what are we to make of the decision to become a man?"
 
Kai Cheng Thom, writing in Slate, offered a detailed criticism of "My New Vagina Won't Make Me Happy." Conceding that Chu is "often brilliant," Thom criticized Chu's New York Times essay as potentially damaging to the cause of trans acceptance, by confirming "unfortunate stereotypes of how people talk and write about trans people."

In a piece for the LA Review of Books, essayist and poet Kay Gabriel said about Females, "Chu makes a claim about what she calls an ontological, or an existential, condition. Being female, in her account, is a subject position outside and against politics."

Personal life
In an interview for the New York City Trans Oral History Project, Chu said that she was in a relationship with a "wonderful cis woman" who was very helpful in preparing for Chu's sex reassignment surgery. Discussing the relationship, Chu stated, "[h]eterosexuality is so much better when there aren't any men in the equation."

Bibliography 
Females (2019). Verso.

Essays 
Chu, Andrea Long; Drager, Emmet Harsin (2019). "After Trans Studies". TSQ: Transgender Studies Quarterly. 6 (1): 103–116.  
Chu, Andrea Long (2018). "I Worked with Avital Ronell. I Believe Her Accuser". The Chronicle of Higher Education. ISSN 0009-5982
Chu, Andrea Long (2019). "The Impossibility of Feminism". Differences. 30 (1): 63–81. . 
 Chu, Andrea Long (2018). "On Liking Women". N Plus One (30). ISSN 1549-0033
Chu, Andrea Long (2018). "Opinion: My New Vagina Won't Make Me Happy". The New York Times. ISSN 1553-8095
Chu, Andrea Long Chu; Berg, Anastasia (2018). "Wanting Bad Things: Andrea Long Chu responds to Amia Srinivasan". The Point. ISSN 2153-4438

References

Sources

External links 
 Andrea Long Chu's website
 Andrea Long Chu's Twitter
 Andrea Long Chu's New York University Comparative Literature department CV and research description
 Excerpt from Andrea Long Chu's Females: A Concern

1992 births
Living people
Transgender women
Writers from North Carolina
Duke University Trinity College of Arts and Sciences alumni
New York University alumni
People from Chapel Hill, North Carolina
LGBT people from North Carolina
People from Asheville, North Carolina
21st-century American LGBT people
American transgender writers